Leigh Hinds (born 17 August 1978, in Beckenham) is an English professional footballer who played as a striker.

Career
Hinds began his professional career with Wimbledon but failed to make an appearance, spending the latter part of the 2000-01 season on loan at Clyde. Hinds moved to Clyde permanently at the start of the following season and spent eighteen months with the Bully Wee before winning a January 2003 move to Aberdeen. Hinds spent a similar length of time at Pittodrie, which included a fine of two weeks' wages for an off-the-field incident, before moving to Partick Thistle at the start of the 2004-05 season. A season at Stranraer followed before Hinds' departure from professional football in May 2006.

References

External links

1978 births
Aberdeen F.C. players
Clyde F.C. players
English footballers
Living people
Partick Thistle F.C. players
Footballers from Beckenham
Scottish Football League players
Scottish Premier League players
Stranraer F.C. players
Wimbledon F.C. players
Association football forwards